Wrigley (South Slavey language: Pehdzeh Ki "clay place") is a "Designated Authority" in the Dehcho Region of the Northwest Territories, Canada.

Today the community can be reached via the Mackenzie Highway. The population continues to maintain a traditional lifestyle, trapping, hunting, and fishing.

The community was named for Joseph Wrigley who was the Hudson's Bay Company Chief Commissioner for British North America (1884-1891).

The Franklin Mountains, which are also on the east bank of the Mackenzie River, overlook the community. Cap Mountain, is the highest peak in the range and is within walking distance of the community. Although not as well known as the Rabbitkettle Hot Springs the Roche qui trempe a l’eau sulphur springs are located downstream of Wrigley.

Demographics 

The majority of its 2016 population (110 people) is First Nations and the predominant languages are North and South Slavey and English.

First Nations
The Dene of the community are represented by the Pehdzeh Ki First Nation and belong to the Dehcho First Nations. The last of the Numbered Treaties, Treaty 11, was signed here 13 July 1921. At that time the Headman was paid $22 and $12 for everybody else.

Services
The community has one store, a health centre and a two-person Royal Canadian Mounted Police detachment.

Education 
The community has a K-9 school, Chief Julian Yendo School with an enrolment of 24 as of 2018. After completion of grade 9 students go to the Thomas Simpson Secondary School in Fort Simpson.

Climate
Wrigley has a continental subarctic climate (Dfc). The area combines mild to warm, short summers with long and very cold winters. The differences between the coldest and warmest month are rather extreme even by continental standards, with the January high being  and the July high being  according to Environment Canada. Transitional seasons are rather short.

References

Communities in the Dehcho Region
Dene communities
Hudson's Bay Company trading posts
Populated places on the Mackenzie River